Diede de Groot defeated Sabine Ellerbrock in the final, 6–0, 6–4 to win the ladies' singles wheelchair tennis title at the 2017 Wimbledon Championships. It was her first major singles title.

Jiske Griffioen was the defending champion but was defeated in the quarterfinals by Aniek van Koot.

Seeds

  Jiske Griffioen (quarterfinals)
  Yui Kamiji (semifinals)

Draw

Finals

References
WC Women's Singles

Women's Wheelchair Singles
Wimbledon Championship by year – Wheelchair women's singles